The Mbarara–Kisangani Road is a road in Uganda and the Democratic Republic of the Congo, connecting the cities of Mbarara and Mpondwe in Uganda to Kasindi, Beni, Komanda and Kisangani in the Democratic Republic of the Congo.

Location

Within Uganda

Within the Democratic Republic of the Congo

Overview
The Mbarara–Kisangani Road is part of the Northern Corridor. This road is expected to improve cross-border trade, tourism, socio-economic development and promote regional integration. The project is being handled directly by the Northern Corridor Transit and Transport Coordination Authority (NCTTCA). The road is also a component of the Lagos–Mombasa Highway

Upgrade to double carriageway
As of February 2019, the Northern Corridor Transit and Transport Coordination Authority, is working directly with the governments of Uganda and the Democratic Republic of the Congo do devise ways to improve this road. It is estimated that the cost of the pre-requisite feasibility study, will cost about US$11.2 million.

In November 2019, Yoweri Museveni the president of Uganda and Félix Tshisekedi, the president of the Democratic Republic of the Congo, at a meeting at Uganda State House in Entebbe, signed agreements to work on key road networks connecting the two countries to ease business. Components of this road are included in the list of roads under consideration for upgrade, within 24 months from November 2019.

See also
 List of roads in Uganda
 List of roads in the Democratic Republic of the Congo

References

External links
 Uganda committed to bilateral collaboration with DRC to develop the Mbarara-Kisangani Road Network As of 20 November 2018.

Roads in Uganda
Transport in Uganda
Geography of Uganda
Roads in the Democratic Republic of the Congo
Geography of the Democratic Republic of the Congo
Transport in the Democratic Republic of the Congo